Todd Greeson (born March 7, 1971) was a Republican member of the Alabama State House of Representatives.  Greeson was first elected in 1998 when he defeated incumbent Democrat Ralph Burke. He did not seek re-election in 2014, instead opting to run for the open State Senate seat in District 8. He lost in the Republican primary.

Greeson holds bachelor's degrees in political science and business administration from Athens State University. Greeson received his master's degree in public administration in 2007 from Troy University. He works in the department of Workforce Development at Northeast Alabama Community College.

References

External links
 Project Vote Smart bio

1971 births
Athens State University alumni
Baptists from Alabama
Insurance agents
Living people
Republican Party members of the Alabama House of Representatives
People from DeKalb County, Alabama
Troy University alumni